Kuntur Wayi or Kuntur Wayin (Quechua kuntur condor, Ancash Quechua wayi house, "condor house", also spelled Condorhuayi, Condor-Huain) is a  mountain in the Wallanka mountain range in the Andes of Peru. It is situated in the Ancash Region, Bolognesi Province, on the border of the districts of Aquia and Huallanca. Kuntur Wayi lies east of the Minapata valley, southwest of Kunkush, south of Wallanka and southeast of Minapata.

Sources 

Mountains of Peru
Mountains of Ancash Region